Bellingshausen may refer to:

 Fabian Gottlieb von Bellingshausen (1778–1852), Baltic German explorer and officer in the Russian navy, after whom are named:
 Bellingshausen Plate, a tectonic plate
 Bellingshausen Sea, off the Antarctic Peninsula of Antarctica
 Bellingshausen Plain, an undersea plain of the Bellingshausen Sea
 Mount Bellingshausen, Antarctica
 Bellingshausen Island in the South Sandwich Islands
 Bellinghausen or Bellingshausen, an atoll in the Society Islands, also known as  Motu One 
 Bellingshausen Point, South Georgia
 Bellingshausen Station, a Russian base on King George Island, Antarctica
 3659 Bellingshausen, an asteroid
 Bellinsgauzen (crater), a lunar crater

See also
 Bellinghausen (disambiguation)